This is a list of all commanders, deputy commanders, senior enlisted leaders, and chiefs of staff of the United States Cyber Command.

Current headquarters staff
  Paul M. Nakasone, Commander
  Timothy D. Haugh, Deputy Commander
  Bradley L. Pyburn, Chief of Staff
  Matteo G. Martemucchi, Director, Intelligence (J2)
  Constantin E. Nicolet, Deputy Director, Intelligence (J2)
  Ryan M. Janovic, Director, Operations (J3)
  Ahmed T. Williamson, Deputy Director, Current Operations (J33)
  Matthew C. Paradise, Deputy Director, Future Operations (J34)
  Heidi Berg, Director, Plans and Policy (J5)
  Christopher R. Reid, Director, Capability and Resource Integration (J8)

List of commanders of the United States Cyber Command

List of deputy commanders of the United States Cyber Command

List of senior enlisted leaders of the United States Cyber Command

List of chiefs of staff of the United States Cyber Command since 2013

Notes

See also
 United States Cyber Command
 Leadership of the United States Africa Command
 Leadership of the United States European Command
 Leadership of the United States Indo-Pacific Command
 Leadership of the United States Northern Command
 Leadership of the United States Space Command
 Leadership of the United States Strategic Command
 Leadership of the United States Transportation Command

References

Lists of American military personnel